Bartosz Konopko (born 6 June 1988) is a Polish short track speed skater. He competed in the 2018 Winter Olympics.

References

1988 births
Living people
Polish male short track speed skaters
Olympic short track speed skaters of Poland
Short track speed skaters at the 2018 Winter Olympics
Sportspeople from Białystok